Kanybek Osmonaliyevich Osmonaliyev (born November 19, 1953 in Beysheke, Kirghiz SSR) is a former Soviet weightlifter, Olympic champion and world champion. He won gold medal in the flyweight class at the 1980 Summer Olympics in Moscow. He was affiliated with Burevestnik Frunze.

References

1953 births
Living people
People from Chüy Region
Soviet male weightlifters
Kyrgyzstani male weightlifters
Weightlifters at the 1980 Summer Olympics
Olympic weightlifters of the Soviet Union
Olympic gold medalists for the Soviet Union
Olympic medalists in weightlifting
Medalists at the 1980 Summer Olympics
Burevestnik (sports society) athletes